The following list sorts countries according to their weighted mean applied import duty on all products. Import duty refers to taxes levied on imported goods, capital and services. The level of customs duties is a direct indicator of the openness of an economy to world trade. However, there may also be import barriers that are not based on the levy of duties. All data is from the world bank.

Import duties are regarded as a variation of protectionism. The average weighted import duty in these important economic areas in 2018 was the following percentage: People's Republic of China: 3.39%, Japan: 2.45%, European Union: 1.69% and the United States: 1.59%. The respective import duty does not apply to countries with which free trade agreements have been concluded.

References 

Tariff rate
Tariff rate